Pandora Hearts is a Japanese manga series written and illustrated by Jun Mochizuki. It was serialized in Square Enix monthly shōnen magazine GFantasy from June 2006 to March 2015. The serial chapters were collected into twenty-four tankōbon volumes. The first was released on November 27, 2006 and the last on June 27, 2015. In English, the series was first licensed by Broccoli Books, but has since been dropped. It was then licensed by Yen Press and began serialization in the June 2009 issue of Yen Plus, and followed-up by its first volume release on December 15, 2009. In Indonesia, the manga has been licensed by Elex Media Komputindo, and in France by Ki-oon.

The manga has been adapted into a 25 episodes anime series by Xebec, which have been broadcast on Tokyo Broadcasting System (TBS), BS-TBS, Chubu-Nippon Broadcasting (CBC), and Mainichi Broadcasting System (MBS). On February 11, 2010, NIS America announced it would release the anime of Pandora Hearts in North America.

Volumes list

 

  
  

|}

References

External links
 

Pandora Hearts at Square Enix

Pandora Hearts